James Frank Rowson (born September 12, 1976) is an American professional baseball coach. He is currently the assistant hitting coach for the Detroit Tigers of Major League Baseball (MLB). He was previously a coach in MLB for the Chicago Cubs, Minnesota Twins and Miami Marlins.

Playing career
The Seattle Mariners drafted Rowson in the ninth round of the 1994 MLB Draft. He played minor league baseball in the Mariners' and the New York Yankees' minor league systems from 1995 to 1997, and played for the Cook County Cheetahs in the independent Heartland League in 1998.

Post-playing career
Rowson served as the Yankees' minor league hitting coordinator for six seasons, joining the Chicago Cubs as their minor league hitting coordinator for the 2012 season. He took over as the hitting coach of the Cubs in June 2012, after Rudy Jaramillo was fired. After the 2013 season, he rejoined the Yankees as their minor league hitting coordinator. Rowson was hired to be the hitting coach for the Minnesota Twins in 2017. In the offseason following the 2019 season, Rowson left the Twins to become the Marlins' bench coach. On November 15, 2022, the Detroit Tigers hired Rowson as an assistant hitting coach.

References

External links

1976 births
Living people
Sportspeople from Mount Vernon, New York
Baseball coaches from New York (state)
African-American baseball coaches
Major League Baseball bench coaches
Major League Baseball hitting coaches
Chicago Cubs coaches
Detroit Tigers coaches
Minnesota Twins coaches
Miami Marlins coaches
Minor league baseball coaches
Everett AquaSox players
Tampa Yankees players
Greensboro Bats players
Oneonta Yankees players
Cook County Cheetahs players
21st-century African-American sportspeople
20th-century African-American sportspeople